Áine Ní Mhuirí (born Dublin, Ireland) is an Irish actress. She began her career at the Damer Theatre, later working in the Abbey Theatre in Dublin, Ireland. Áine is a fluent Irish language speaker.

Career 
In 1975, she appeared in a play by Irish playwright Teresa Deevy called "Katie Roche" where she played the part of Margaret Drybone.

She appeared in the 1987 film, The Lonely Passion of Judith Hearne based on the novel by Brian Moore.
In 1989 she played Masie Madigan in the London National Theatre production of Juno and the Paycock.

She played Lily in the Irish Soap Opera Fair City on RTÉ One.

In 2001, Mhuirí won the CFT Excellence Award for Best Actress in a Television Series for her role as Kathleen Hendley in Ballykissangel. She appeared in 53 episodes, from 1996–2001.

In 2012, Áine appeared in Pan Pan Theatre Company's production of Ibsen's A Doll House at Smock Alley Theatre.

She played Mrs. Taylor in several of the Jack Taylor, an Irish television drama based on a series of novels by Ken Bruen including "The Magdalen Martyrs" (2011), and "The Dramatist" (2013).

Áine Ní Mhuirí is scheduled to play in Embers, a theatricalized presentation of a radio play by Samuel Beckett, staged by the Pan Pan Theatre Company at the Brooklyn Academy of Music in September 2015.

Filmography

Film

Television

References

External links
 
 Aine Ni Mhuiri at The Agency
 Áine Ní Mhuirí at The Teresa Deevy Archive
 Áine Ní Mhuirí at The Abbey Theatre Archive

Irish film actresses
Irish television actresses
Year of birth missing (living people)
Actresses from Dublin (city)
Irish stage actresses
Living people